The Grand Falconer of France was a position in the King's Household in France from the Middle Ages to the French Revolution.

History
The position first appeared in 1250 as "Master Falconer of the King" (Maître Fauconnier). The title was changed to Grand Falconer in 1406, although the title of "First Falconer" (Premier Fauconnier) was sometimes also used. The Grand Falconer was responsible for organizing the royal falcon hunt and for caring for the king's hunting birds. The position was one of the "Great Offices of the Maison du Roi".

From the reign of Louis XIV, the position became purely honorific, as the kings had stopped hunting with birds of prey. This notwithstanding, Louis XIV maintained an aviary of hunting birds, located (from 1680 on) in Montainville, as a symbol of power. Falcons were presented to the king at the start of each year in the Galerie des Glaces of the château of Versailles, generally in the presence of foreign ambassadors.  Only northern kings and the Grand Falconer had the right to pose a falcon on the hand of the king.

The coat of arms of the Grand Falconer featured two lures in blue and fleur-de-lys, placed below and to each side of the shield.

Grand Falconers
c.1250: Jean de Beaune (until 1406 the title was Master Falconer of the King)
c.1274: Étienne Granché
dates?: Simon de Champdivers
c.1313: Pierre de Montguignard
c.1325: Pierre de Neuvy
c.1317: Jean Candavenes
c.1338: Philippe Danvin
c.1351: Jean de Serens
c.1354: Jean de Pisseleu
c.1367: Eustache de Chisy
c.1371: Nicolas Thomas
c.1372: André d'Humières
1381: Enguerrand Dargies
1385: Enguerrand de Laigny
1394: Jean de Sorvilliers
1406: Eustache de Gaucourt "Rassin" (†c.1415) (henceforth, the title was Grand Falconer of the King, except where indicated)
1415: Jean V Malet de Granville et de Montagu († after 1441)
1416: Nicolas de Bruneval
1418: Guillaume Després
1428: Jean de Lubin (First Falconer of the King)
1429: Philippe de La Châtre
c.1441: Arnoulet de Caves (First Falconer of the King)
1455: Georges de La Châtre
1468: Olivier Salart, seigneur de Bonnel
c.1480: Jacques Odart, seigneur de Cursay
c.1514: Raoul Vernon, seigneur de Montreuil-Bonin
c.1521: René de Cossé, seigneur de Brissac (also Grand Panetier)
c.1549: Louis Prévost de Sansac (First Falconer of the King)
c.1550: Charles I de Cossé, comte de Brissac (also Grand Panetier, Marshal and Grand Master of the Artillery)
c.1563: Timoléon de Cossé, comte de Brissac (also Grand Panetier and Marshal)
1569: Charles II de Cossé, comte and then duc de Brissac (also Grand Panetier and Marshal)
dates?: Robert de La Vieuville, baron de Rugles et d'Arzillières
1610: Charles de La Vieuville
1612: André de Vivonne, seigneur de la Béraudière
dates?: Nicolas de La Rochefoucauld
1616: Charles d'Albert (1578–1621), duc de Luynes (also Constable of France)
1622: Claude de Lorraine (1578–1657), prince de Joinville, duc de Chevreuse (also Grand Chambellain)
1643: Louis Charles d'Albert de Luynes (1620–1699), duc de Luynes, duc de Chevreuse
1650: Nicolas Dauvet, baron de Boursault
1672: Henry François Dauvet, marquis de Saint-Phalle († 1688)
1688: François Dauvet, baron de Boursault († 1718)
1717: François Louis Dauvet, baron de Boursault
1748: Louis César de La Baume Le Blanc, duc de La Vallière (1708–1780)
1762: Louis Gaucher de Châtillon (1737–1762)
1780: Joseph Hyacinthe François de Paule de Rigaud, Comte de Vaudreuil (1740–1817)

See also
 Great Officers of the Crown of France
 Maison du Roi
 Protoierakarios

References
This article is based on the article Grand Fauconnier de France from the French Wikipedia, retrieved on September 5, 2006.

External links
 Grand Falconer Heraldry (in French)

Court titles in the Ancien Régime
Falconry
Hunting in France